Ōtātara is an outer suburb of New Zealand's southernmost city, Invercargill. It is surrounded by the Ōreti River to the west and south, and its estuary and Invercargill Airport to the east, and West Plains to the north. Historically, it was in Southland County before it was abolished.

The main thoroughfare in Ōtātara is Dunns Road, which continues westward across the Ōreti River bridge to road's end at Ōreti Beach, towards Invercargill it becomes Stead Street at the old city/county boundary, passing between the estuary and the airport before crossing the Waihopai River bridge into the city proper.  

There are several local bush walks through totara forests, and numerous recreational facilities in the area including:MTB tracks, rowing, speed boating, two golf courses and the nearby Ōreti beach.

The New Zealand Ministry for Culture and Heritage gives a translation of "place of loosening" for Ōtātara.

Demographics

Ōtātara had a population of 3,144 at the 2018 New Zealand census, an increase of 108 people (3.6%) since the 2013 census, and an increase of 402 people (14.7%) since the 2006 census. There were 1,119 households. There were 1,620 males and 1,527 females, giving a sex ratio of 1.06 males per female. The median age was 42.7 years (compared with 37.4 years nationally), with 693 people (22.0%) aged under 15 years, 405 (12.9%) aged 15 to 29, 1,641 (52.2%) aged 30 to 64, and 408 (13.0%) aged 65 or older.

Ethnicities were 94.2% European/Pākehā, 12.5% Māori, 1.4% Pacific peoples, 1.7% Asian, and 2.1% other ethnicities (totals add to more than 100% since people could identify with multiple ethnicities).

The proportion of people born overseas was 12.2%, compared with 27.1% nationally.

Although some people objected to giving their religion, 55.1% had no religion, 36.7% were Christian, 0.2% were Hindu, 0.1% were Muslim, 0.3% were Buddhist and 1.3% had other religions.

Of those at least 15 years old, 606 (24.7%) people had a bachelor or higher degree, and 414 (16.9%) people had no formal qualifications. The median income was $45,400, compared with $31,800 nationally. 696 people (28.4%) earned over $70,000 compared to 17.2% nationally. The employment status of those at least 15 was that 1,431 (58.4%) people were employed full-time, 423 (17.3%) were part-time, and 51 (2.1%) were unemployed.

Education
Ōtātara School is a contributing primary school serving years 1 to 6 with a roll of  students as of  The school began as Otatara Bush School in 1879.

References

Further reading

Suburbs of Invercargill
Populated places in Southland, New Zealand